Carlos Garrido Serrano (born 2 April 1994) is a Spanish footballer who plays for CD Don Benito as a central defender.

Club career
Born in Alcalá la Real, Jaén, Andalusia, Garrido joined Sevilla FC's youth setup in 2004 at the age of ten. He was promoted to the reserves ahead of the 2013–14 season, and made his debut on 30 August 2013 by starting in a 0–0 away draw against La Hoya Lorca CF.

On 21 August 2015 Garrido moved to another reserve team, Sporting de Gijón B also in the third level. He scored his first senior goal on 25 March of the following year, but in a 2–6 home loss against CD Izarra.

On 11 August 2016 Garrido signed for UD Almería, being initially assigned to the B-side in Tercera División. He made his first team debut the following 29 January, starting as a right back in a 3–0 Segunda División home win over Real Oviedo.

Notes

References

External links

1994 births
Living people
Sportspeople from the Province of Jaén (Spain)
Spanish footballers
Footballers from Andalusia
Association football defenders
Segunda División players
Segunda División B players
Tercera División players
Sevilla Atlético players
Sporting de Gijón B players
UD Almería B players
UD Almería players
Club Recreativo Granada players
CF Lorca Deportiva players
Spain youth international footballers